Manuel Mendoza may refer to:

 Manuel V. Mendoza (1922-2001), American master sergeant active during WWII
 Manuel Mendoza (footballer, born 1976), Ecuadorian football defender
 Manuel Mendoza (footballer, born 1989), Ecuadorian football goalkeeper